The 1997 Meath Intermediate Football Championship is the 71st edition of the Meath GAA's premier club Gaelic football tournament for intermediate graded teams in County Meath, Ireland. The tournament consists of 16 teams, with the winner going on to represent Meath in the Leinster Intermediate Club Football Championship. The championship starts with a group stage and then progresses to a knock out stage.

This was St. Colmcille's first year in the Intermediate grade since 1988, after 8 years in the Senior grade since being regraded in 1996.
 
Drumconrath were promoted after claiming the 1996 Meath Junior Football Championship title.

On 5 October 1997, Dunshaughlin claimed their 2nd Intermediate championship title when they defeated Duleek 3–14 to 1–6 in the final and hence ended their 15-year exodus from the top flight.

Team changes

The following teams have changed division since the 1996 championship season.

From I.F.C.
Promoted to S.F.C.
 Cortown  -  (Intermediate Champions)

Regraded to 1997 J.A.F.C.
 Gaeil Colmcille 'B'
 St. Mary's Donore

To I.F.C.
Regraded from S.F.C.
 St. Colmcille's

Promoted from J.A.F.C.
 Drumconrath - (Junior 'A' Champions)

Group stage
There are 3 groups called Group A, B and C. The 2 top finishers in Group A and B will qualify for the semi finals. First place in Group C and runners up in each group qualify for the quarter finals. In the event of two teams being level on points and only one qualification spot available, a playoff will be conducted to determine final placings.

Group A

Round 1:
 Dunshaughlin 1-10, 1-7 Drumconrath, Rathkenny, 5/4/1997,
 Donaghmore/Ashbourne 0-10, 0-8 Moynalty, Kilberry, 6/4/1997,
 Ballivor 2-9, 1-7 Syddan, Martry, 6/4/1997,

Round 2:
 Drumconrath 0–13, 1-10 Moynalty, Nobber, 19/4/1997,
 Donaghmore/Ashbourne 2-8, 1-10 Syddan, Seneschalstown, 20/4/1997,
 Dunshaughlin 0-10, 0-9 Ballivor, Trim, 20/4/1997,

Round 3:
 Drumconrath 0-12, 1-4 Ballivor, ???, 4/5/1997,
 Dunshaughlin 0–9, 0-9 Donaghmore/Ashbourne, Skryne, 4/5/1997,
 Syddan 1-13, 0-8 Moynalty, Kells, 18/5/1997,

Round 4:
 Donaghmore/Ashbourne 1-8, 0-8 Ballivor, Walterstown, 20/6/1997,
 Drumconrath 0-13, 0-6 Syddan, Meath Hill, 21/6/1997,
 Dunshaughlin 6-10, 1-10 Moynalty, Kilberry, 22/6/1997,

Round 5:
 Drumconrath 0-8, 0-4 Donaghmore/Ashbourne, Slane, 12/7/1997,
 Dunshaughlin 0-14, 1-9 Syddan, Kilberry, 12/7/1997,
 Ballivor w/o, scr Moynalty,

Quarter-Final Playoff:
 Drumconrath 0-11, 2-4 Donaghmore/Ashbourne, Slane, 24/8/1997,

Group B

Round 1:
 Duleek 1-10, 0-7 St. Colmcille's, Bellewstown, 6/4/1997,
 Blackhall Gaels 2-10, 2-9 St. Patrick's, Skryne, 6/4/1997,
 Rathkenny - Bye

Round 2:
 Blackhall Gaels 1-7, 0-5 Rathkenny, Walterstown, 14/4/1997,
 St. Patrick's 2-11, 1-6 St. Colmcille's, Duleek, 20/4/1997,
 Duleek - Bye,

Round 3:
 Duleek 1-8, 0-7 Rathkenny, Seneschalstown, 4/5/1997,
 Blackhall Gaels 0-14, 0-9 St. Colmcille's, Walterstown, 4/5/1997,
 St. Patrick's - Bye,

Round 4:
 St. Patrick's 1-10, 1-5 Rathkenny, Donore, 18/5/1997,
 Duleek 1-8, 0-10 Blackhall Gaels, Skryne, 18/5/1997,
 St. Colmcille's - Bye,

Round 5:
 Duleek 2-12, 2-10 St. Patrick's, Pairc Tailteann, 24/8/1997,
 Ratheknny w/o, scr St. Colmcille's,
 Blackhall Gaels - Bye,

Group C

Round 1:
 St. Ultan's 2-13, 3-7 Ballinabrackey, Longwood, 6/4/1997,
 Castletown 2-19, 0-9 Athboy, Carlanstown, 6/4/1997,
 St. Brigid's - Bye,

Round 2:
 St. Ultan's 2-13, 1-14 St. Brigid's, Ballinlough, 19/4/1997,
 Castletown 1-16, 0-11 Ballinabrackey, Athboy, 20/4/1997,
 Athboy - Bye,

Round 3:
 St. Brigid's 0–11, 2-5 Athboy, Kilskyre, 3/5/1997,
 St. Ultan's 1-9, 1-7 Castletown, Kilberry, 4/5/1997,
 Ballinabrackey - Bye,

Round 4:
 St. Ultan's 4-10, 1-7 Athboy, Cortown, 17/5/1997,
 St. Brigid's 1-18, 1-8 Ballinabrackey, Ballivor, 17/5/1997,
 Castletown - Bye,

Round 5:
 Castletown 1-13, 0-6 St. Brigid's, Kells, 8/6/1997,
 Athboy w/o, scr Ballinabrackey,
 St. Ultan's - Bye,

Knock-out Stages

Finals
The teams in the quarter-finals are the second placed teams from each group and the Group C winner. The teams in the semi finals are Group A and B winners along with the quarter final winners.

Quarter Final:
 Drumconrath 0–9, 0-9 Castletown, Syddan, 30/8/1997,
 Blackhall Gaels 1-13, 0-7 St. Ultan's, Skryne, 31/8/1997,

Quarter Final Replay:
 Drumconrath 1-11, 1-8 Castletown, Syddan, 7/9/1997,

Semi Final:
 Dunshaughlin 2-13, 1-12 Blackhall Gaels, Pairc Tailteann, 7/9/1997,
 Duleek 2-9, 0-14 Drumconrath, Pairc Tailteann, 21/9/1997,

Final:
 Dunshaughlin 3-14, 1-6 Duleek, Pairc Tailteann, 5/10/1997.

References

External links

Meath Intermediate Football Championship
Meath Intermediate Football Championship